Lenkerville is an unincorporated community and census-designated place in Upper Paxton Township, Dauphin County, Pennsylvania, United States. It is less than one mile south of the borough of Millersburg along Pennsylvania Route 147, which lies on the east bank of the Susquehanna River. As of the 2010 census the population was 550.

Demographics

References

Census-designated places in Dauphin County, Pennsylvania
Census-designated places in Pennsylvania